Roman Fischer (born 3 August 1915, date of death unknown) was an Austrian fencer. He competed in the individual and team épée and the team foil events at the 1936 Summer Olympics. Fischer was also the Austrian national foil champion in 1937, and a year later, he also became the German foil champion.

References

External links
 

1915 births
Year of death missing
Austrian male épée fencers
Olympic fencers of Austria
Fencers at the 1936 Summer Olympics
Austrian male foil fencers